Led Zeppelin's 1968 tour of the United Kingdom was the first concert tour of the United Kingdom by the English rock band. It commenced on 4 October and concluded on 20 December 1968.

For some of these early shows, the band were billed as the "New Yardbirds". Press releases eventually announced that they would make their debut under the name 'Led Zeppelin' on 25 October at the University of Surrey (although posters advertising this concert erroneously continued to bill them as the 'New Yardbirds').

During this tour the band went to Olympic Studios in London to record their debut album, which took a mere 36 studio hours.

There was very little press reaction to this tour.

The band's second London concert (18 October, billed as 'New Yardbirds'; 9 November, billed as 'Led Zeppelin') at the Roundhouse on 9 November doubled as singer Robert Plant's wedding reception.

Jeff Beck attended the Canterbury show on 13 December. "Things went slightly wrong!" he recalled to Jimmy Page. "Your fucking amp blew up and I went, 'What's up with that, Jim?' And then I realised it was my amp, because my roadie had moonlighted and rented Jimmy my equipment! And he'd changed the impedance on the back so it sounded like a pile of shit! But I could see the potential. It was just amazing – blew the house down, blew everybody away."

Tour set list
Exact set lists during this tour are sketchy, due partly to the lack of early live Led Zeppelin bootleg recordings. Old Yardbirds' live staples such as "Train Kept A-Rollin'", "Dazed and Confused", "White Summer" and possibly "For Your Love" were performed, in addition to material from the then unfinished debut album, such as "Communication Breakdown", I Can't Quit You Baby, "You Shook Me", "Babe I'm Gonna Leave You", and "How Many More Times". The band also likely performed a Garnet Mimms cover, "As Long as I Have You".

A likely set list for the tour was:

"Train Kept A-Rollin'" (Bradshaw, Kay, Mann)
"I Can't Quit You Baby" (Dixon)
"As Long as I Have You" (Mimms)
"Dazed and Confused" (Page)
"White Summer" (Page)
"For Your Love" (Gouldman)
"You Shook Me" (Dixon, Lenoir)
"Pat's Delight" (Bonham)
"Babe I'm Gonna Leave You" (Bredon, Page, Plant)
"How Many More Times" (Bonham, Jones, Page)
"Communication Breakdown" (Bonham, John Paul Jones, Page)

Tour dates

References

External links
Comprehensive archive of known concert appearances by Led Zeppelin (official website)
Led Zeppelin concert set-lists

Sources
Lewis, Dave and Pallett, Simon (1997) Led Zeppelin: The Concert File, London: Omnibus Press. .

Led Zeppelin concert tours
1968 concert tours
1968 in the United Kingdom
October 1968 events in the United Kingdom
November 1968 events in the United Kingdom
December 1968 events in the United Kingdom
Concert tours of the United Kingdom